The 1985 John Player Special League was the seventeenth competing of what was generally known as the Sunday League. The competition was won for the third time by Essex County Cricket Club.

Rain affected most rounds of the Sunday League that season with many abandoned, (27 no results, 20% of fixtures) and shortened matches. On 7 July at Knypersley, Derbyshire established a league record by hitting 18 sixes in their score of 292-9 from 40 overs. In the final round of matches on 15 September Essex beat Yorkshire at Chelmsford to retain the Sunday League. Sussex finished second and Hampshire finished third.

Essex had a great record in that season's three one-day competitions. Also winning the NatWest Trophy and finishing runners up in the third competition Benson and Hedges Cup.

Standings

Batting averages

Bowling averages

See also
Sunday League

References

John Player
Pro40